Laura B. Whitmore (born March 11, 1965) is a music marketer, singer/songwriter, event producer, and founder of the Women's International Music Network (The WiMN). She currently lives in Onset, MA.

Early life 
Laura B. Whitmore was born in Framingham, MA. She attended Hofstra University, earning a B.S. in 1986 in Music Merchandising, where she was honored by Pi Kappa Lambda. In 1999 she earned her M.B.A. in Marketing also from Hofstra where she was invited to be a member of Beta Gamma Sigma. She also completed a certificate program at Audio Recording Technology Institute (ARTI) in New York City.

Career 
While in college Whitmore worked for the Nassau Symphony Orchestra, on Long Island, NY, computerizing their systems and renovating their operations. After graduating in 1986, Whitmore worked in the direct marketing department of CBS Records under the Senior VP of Direct Marketing, Neal Keating, who was credited as a marketing pioneer as he spearheaded the formation of the Columbia House record club.
After two years with CBS Records, Whitmore left to join Korg USA in Westbury, NY, in 1988 as a marketing assistant and artist relations representative. She moved on to Marketing Services Specialist and took on the responsibilities of media planning and negation, public relations, and trade show planning. After she earned her master's degree in 1999, she was named Marketing Services Manager. In addition to handling marketing, PR and artist relations for the Korg, Marshall, and VOX brands, Whitmore was appointed editor of Korg’s ProView Magazine and of the VOX Catalog, for which she won a Davey Award in 2006.

In 2008, Whitmore left Korg after 20 years of service. She then moved to Lafayette, CA and launched her own business, Mad Sun Marketing, starting off with just two clients, Korg USA and Academic Superstore. Mad Sun Marketing specializes in marketing, PR, artist relations, event production, and graphic design for music and audio companies. Past and current clients of Mad Sun include 65amps, Academic Superstore, Acoustic Amplification, Agile Partners, Colby Amplifiers, Dean Markley USA, EarthSync, Gear Collector, Jammit, Korg, KVRaudio, Muse Research, MusicFirst, NewBay Media, Notion Music, Peavey Electronics, SIR Entertainment Services, SIR Stage37, SoundTree, Sterling Audio, and the film 'Take Me To The River.' 

In November 2014, Whitmore came on board as the education director for the film, Take Me To The River. The documentary, directed and produced by Martin Shore celebrates the intergenerational and interracial musical influence of Memphis in the face of pervasive discrimination and segregation. The film brings multiple generations of award-winning Memphis and Mississippi Delta musicians together, following them through the creative process of recording a historic new album, to re-imagine the utopia of racial, gender and generational collaboration of Memphis in its heyday. Take Me to The River features Terrence Howard, William Bell, Snoop Dogg, Mavis Staples, Otis Clay, Lil P-Nut, Charlie Musselwhite, Bobby “Blue” Bland, Yo Gotti, Bobby Rush, Frayser Boy, The North Mississippi All-Stars and many more. The education initiative partnered with Berklee College of Music to produce a curriculum and events based on the film.

In May 2015 she and former Guitar World editor Brad Tolinski formed BackStory, a live interview event series that began by  streaming on aol.com as part of the AOL Build series. In 2016 the began to independently produce the series from New York City venues like The Cutting Room and Sony Hall with media partners like Guitar World and Parade Magazine. To date interviews with iconic musicians that the pair have produced include Ringo Starr, Jon Anderson, Shinedown, John Oates, Nile Rodgers, Joe Satriani, Warren Haynes, The Zombies, Colbie Cailat, Amy Lee, Ace Frehley and many, many more.

In April 2020 Whitmore became the Vice President of Marketing for Positive Grid, a music technology software and hardware company. Later that same year she was named Senior Vice President of Marketing for that company.

The Women's International Music Network (The WiMN) 
In November 2012, Whitmore founded The Women's International Music Network, or The WiMN. The goal of the organization is to provide support, information, and a sense of community for women in all walks of the industry, including performers, business insiders, educators and students. Serving as a centerpiece for the WiMN, the official site www.TheWiMN.com is an outlet for the group to share news pertaining to female musicians, projects relating to women in the industry, products targeted to female musicians, special WiMN event details and other events in the community.

As the first official event of the organization, Whitmore hosted and emceed the first annual Women's International Music Network breakfast and the She Rocks Awards, which took place during the NAMM Show in Anaheim, CA, on January 25, 2013 at the Anaheim Marriott Hotel. The event honored contributors to the industry including producer/songwriter Holly Knight, guitarist Orianthi, Tish Ciravolo from Daisy Rock Girl Guitars, Mary Peavey of Peavey Electronics, Laura Taylor of Guitar Center, Carla DeSantis Black of MEOW and Pauline France of Fender Guitars. It featured a performance by Orianthi who was joined on stage by bassist Nik West and drummer Brittany Maccarello. The event was hosted in partnership with NewBay Media, the publishers of Guitar World, Guitar Player, Bass Player, Electronic Musician and other music industry media outlets.

Prior to the official launch of the Women's International Music Network, Whitmore organized the first annual Women’s Music Summit which took place in Upstate New York at Full Moon Resort on August 27–31, 2012. The event featured Meshell Ndegeocello, Melissa Auf der Maur, Malina Moye and Marnie Stern as guest speakers and performers and provided workshops for female musicians.

In February 2013, The WiMN announced the 2013 Women’s Music Summit, which was hosted at Musicians Institute from July 26–28, 2013 in Los Angeles, CA. It featured workshops by guitarist Jennifer Batten, songwriter/producer Holly Knight, composer Starr Parodi, drummer Val Sepulveda, and vocal coach and president of LAWIM, Leanne Summers.

In January 2015, the WiMN hosted the third annual She Rocks Awards. Taking place on Friday evening at the Anaheim Hilton Hotel, the event honored Colby Caillat, The Bangles, Mindi Abair, Amani Duncan of Martin Guitar, Craigie Zildjian of Avedis Zildjian Company, Katie Kailus of Music Inc. Magazine, Paula Salvatore of Capitol Studios, Debbie Cavalier of Berklee College of Music and Gayle Beacock of Beacock Music. Whitmore hosted the event along with co-host guitarist Orianthi.

The fourth annual She Rocks Awards took place on January 22, 2016 at the Hilton Anaheim Hotel as part of the NAMM Show. The event was co-hosted by Whitmore and guitarist Nita Strauss. Honorees included Chaka Khan, Jennifer Batten, Amy Heidemann of Karmin, Becky Gebhardt and Mona Tavakoli from the Rock N Roll Camp for Girls L.A. and Raining Jane, Cathy Carter Duncan of Seymour Duncan, Crystal Morris of Gator Cases, Chalise Zolezzi of Taylor Guitars, Mindy Abovitz of Tom Tom Magazine, Mary Luehrsen of NAMM, Leslie Ann Jones, Pamela Cole and Leigh Maples of Fanny's House of Music, Tom Gilbert, and Sujata Murthy of Universal Music. Performers included The Command Sisters, Jenna Paone, Malina Moye, Jennifer Batten, Raining Jane and the band Rock Sugah, which features Divinity Roxx, Kat Dyson, Benita Lewis and Lynette Williams. 

In 2018 the She Rocks Awards moved to the House of Blues Anaheim and Melissa Etheridge, Pat Benatar, The B-52s and many others were honored. The 2022 She Rocks Awards is slated for June 2, 2022 at The Ranch in Anaheim.

Other projects 
In October 2013, Whitmore became the editor of Guitar World Magazine's AcousticNation.com, a channel of GuitarWorld.com that focuses on acoustic music. She hosted a series of events and panels at the Nashville NAMM show in July 2014 as the editor and sponsor of the Acoustic Nation Stage. During that event she also hosted a showcase for female singer/songwriters for the Women's International Music Network.

Whitmore is the creator of the Guitar World Magazine blog series, Guitar Girl’d, which launched in May 2011. She has hosted and moderated several workshops and panels at events such as NAMM and SXSW on the topics of marketing, PR, apps and music making, and songwriting. Until her recent move to the East Coast she was the co-host of a monthly open mic series as part of the West Coast Songwriters Association in her previous town of Lafayette, CA.

As part of MakeMusic NY, Whitmore co-produced a "group guitar jam" called Mass Appeal Guitars on June 21, 2012 where hundreds of guitarists played together in Union Square, New York City. Whitmore lead the song "What's Up" by 4 Non Blondes. The event featured the premiere performance of a music group led by guitarist Alex Skolnick called Planetary Coalition. Skolnick closed the event by leading the song "Smoke on the Water." She again co-produced the event for 2013 and lead the song "Ho Hey" by the Lumineers. Whitmore invited rock vocalist MilitiA. of the band Judas Priestess to complete the playalong, who closed the event with "Living After Midnight." She produced the event again in 2014, which brought the largest audience yet out to Union Square Park for the group jam. Artists Alex Skolnick and the NYC group Wise Girl performed. Whitmore led the song "The Only Exception" by Paramore.

Whitmore is a songwriter who has participated in several online workshops presented by Berklee College of Music. She writes and performs regularly and was previously in a band called Summer Music Project. As a soloist, she has collaborated with Collective Soul guitarist, Joel Kosche. In February 2012 she recorded the original song "Don't Take it Easy" on the John Lennon Educational Tour bus, which resulted in a video recording featured on GuitarWorld.com

In 2015 she was selected as the commencement speaker for McNally Smith College of Music in St. Paul, MN. She gave an address focusing on her varied history in the music business on April 25, 2015.

In 2015 she also launched a series of house concerts under the name Acoustic Kitchen, starting with guests Will Dailey and Jenna Paone, and then streaming live on twitch.tv/acoustickitchen with guest Ali Handal. She continues to produce this series.

In 2016 she toured with Ali Handal and Laura Clapp under the name She 3. She is currently finishing an album with Jenna Paone to be released in 2022.

In 2017 she became the music contributor for Parade.com

Music 
In 2018 Whitmore partnered with singer/songwriter Jenna Paone to write and create the project, 'Girl, the album.' It is slated for release in  2022.

References

1965 births
Living people
Hofstra University alumni